Freekscape: Escape From Hell is a puzzle-platform game developed by Brazilian company Kidguru Studios and published by Creat Studios for the Sony PlayStation Portable, and released on 8 April 2010. The game uses the Vicious Engine.

The game involves controlling a demon called Freek who is attempting to exit hell. The player must solve puzzles in order to be able to progress through each level.

Reception
In their review of the game, IGN gave it a score of 7.5.

References

2010 video games
PlayStation Portable games
PlayStation Portable-only games
Puzzle-platform games
Video games about demons
Video games developed in Brazil
Video games set in hell